Luis Antonio Marcoleta Yáñez (born 1 February 1959) is a Chilean former footballer and manager.

Honours

Club

Player
América de Cali
 Primera División de Colombia: 1984

Manager
Naval
 Tercera División de Chile (1): 1999

Ñublense
 Tercera División de Chile (1): 2004

Curicó Unido
 Primera B de Chile (1): 2008

San Marcos de Arica
 Primera B de Chile (2): 2012, 2013–14

References

External links
  

Living people
1957 births
People from Antofagasta
Chilean footballers
Chilean Primera División players
Primera B de Chile players
Categoría Primera A players
C.D. Antofagasta footballers
Magallanes footballers
Deportes Magallanes footballers
América de Cali footballers
Audax Italiano footballers
Deportes Iquique footballers
San Luis de Quillota footballers
Unión La Calera footballers
Deportes Valdivia footballers
Club Deportivo Palestino footballers
C.D. Huachipato footballers
Expatriate footballers in Colombia
Chilean expatriate sportspeople in Colombia
Chilean football managers
Primera B de Chile managers
Chilean Primera División managers
Segunda División Profesional de Chile managers
Deportes Valdivia managers
Universidad de Concepción managers
Deportes Antofagasta managers
Unión La Calera managers
Deportes Concepción (Chile) managers
Ñublense managers
Curicó Unido managers
San Marcos de Arica managers
Everton de Viña del Mar managers
Deportes La Serena managers
Rangers de Talca managers
Association football forwards